Edward Bwanali was a Malawian politician. Bwanali was foreign minister of his country from 1994 to 1996.  Bwanali died in 1998.

He was the minister of finance from 1978 to 1980, and from 1984 to 1986.

References

Year of birth missing
1998 deaths
Malawian diplomats
Finance ministers of Malawi
Foreign Ministers of Malawi